Salarias fasciatus, commonly known as the jewelled blenny or lawnmower blenny  is a benthic, neritic, marine fish species endemic Australasia. Despite being known as the lawnmower blenny, due to its propensity to consume algae growth from rocks and glass, it is principally a detritivore, with plant material making up only 15% of its diet. . The lawnmower blenny is generally regarded as compatible with most other marine fish species and as a group with other lawnmower blennies. The lawnmower blenny blends in with its surroundings, changing color to hide itself from predators.  It stays mostly on the ocean or aquarium floor or on any rock or corals.

Description
Salarias fasciatus is typically olive to brown with dark bars and a large number of round or elongated white spots of different sizes. The blenny has many pale spots, dark streaks that run anteriorly, and several dark bands. It is a small fish, which reaches a maximum length of  TL.  It possesses no notch in its dorsal fin. The dorsal and anal fins are attached to the base of the caudal fin by a skin membrane. Adult males have elongated anterior rays on the anal fin.  There are usually dark longitudinal lines on the front part of the body, and small bright blue spots with dark outlines along the rear part of the body.

Distribution and habitat
It is most often found on shallow reef flats that have heavy algae cover.

Taxonomy
Georges Cuvier described this species as Salarias quadripennis in 1816 and named it as the type species of the genus Salarias but Cuvier's name was shown to be a junior synonym of Bloch's Blennius fasciatus.

Gallery

References 

Algae-Eating Blennies of the Genera Salarias and Atrosalarias
Lawnmower Blenny, Rockskipper Blenny
Salarias fasciatus

External links
 

fasciatus
Fish of the Indian Ocean
Fish of the Pacific Ocean
Taxa named by Marcus Elieser Bloch
Fish described in 1786